Robert Melvin Mike (October 29, 1918 – June 29, 1981) was an American and Canadian football player who played at the tackle position on both offense and defense. He played college football for Florida A&M and UCLA and professional football for the San Francisco 49ers and Calgary Stampeders.

Early years
Mike was born in 1920 in Edison, Georgia. He attended Steubenville High School in Steubenville, Ohio.

Military and college football 
Mike played college football for the Florida A&M Rattlers and the UCLA in 1946 and 1947. He also served in the United States Army Air Forces. While serving in the military, he was stationed at the Tuskegee Army Air Field and played for the Tuskegee football team. During his time at UCLA, the California Eagle described him as "probably the best-known Negro athlete in the Southland." He was teammates at UCLA with Jackie Robinson. Robinson went on to break the color barrier in Major League Baseball. Mike became one of the first African Americans to play in the All-America Football Conference.

He left UCLA in 1948 despite having collegiate eligibility remaining.

Professional football
Mike played professional football in the All-America Football Conference for the San Francisco 49ers during their 1948 and 1949 seasons. He appeared in a total of 26 games for the 49ers, eight of them as a starter.

In July 1950, Mike was hired as the 49ers first black scout, assigned to search for black players across the country. He was fired in September 1950 after team owner Tony Morabito saw him with a light-skinned black woman who Morabito believed to be white.

He resumed his playing career in the Canadian Football League for the Calgary Stampeders during their 1952 and 1953 seasons. He appeared in 21 games for Stampeders.

Family and later years
After his playing career ended, Mike accepted a position as the line coach for the Wiley Wildcats in Texas. He died in 1981 at age 62.

References

1918 births
1981 deaths
San Francisco 49ers (AAFC) players
Calgary Stampeders players
Florida A&M Rattlers football players
UCLA Bruins football players
Players of American football from Georgia (U.S. state)
American football tackles
United States Army Air Forces personnel of World War II
San Francisco 49ers players
Wiley Wildcats football coaches